Old Miakka Preserve is a  preserve located north of Old Miakka in Sarasota County, Florida. The preserve contains  of hiking trails.

History
The land was acquired through Sarasota County's Environmentally Sensitive Lands Protection Program (ESLPP) in August 2006.

References

External links
 Official website

Nature reserves in Florida
Protected areas of Sarasota County, Florida
2006 establishments in Florida
Parks in Sarasota County, Florida